Bloomfield Ridge is the name for two different locations  in the Canadian province of New Brunswick:

 Bloomfield Ridge in an unincorporated rural community in Kings County
  Bloomfield Ridge is a neighbourhood in Upper Miramichi in York County